Kayes is a surname. Notable people with the surname include:

Imrul Kayes, Bangladeshi cricketer 
Joe Kayes (born 1991), New Zealand-born Australian water polo player
Kerry Kayes (born 1950), British bodybuilder
Nicola Kayes, New Zealand health psychologist

See also: Kayes (disambiguation)